Arcadio Pastor Márquez Castro (born 12 August 1977) is a Venezuelan football manager, currently in charge of Titanes.

Career
Born in Colón, Táchira, Márquez worked at several countries before being named manager of Dominican side Atlético Vega Real on 9 October 2015. He resigned the following 5 May, and was appointed in charge of Llaneros back in his home country on 13 August 2016.

Márquez left Llaneros on 15 March 2017, after winning only one point out of 15 in the new campaign.

On 3 February 2018, Márquez moved abroad again and took over Bolivian side . He returned to Furrial in October, and avoided relegation from Segunda División with the side.

On 13 September 2019, Márquez was appointed manager of fellow second division side , and managed to avoid relegation with the side.

On 6 August 2021, Márquez was announced as the head coach of Primera División club Mineros.

References

External links

1977 births
Living people
People from Táchira
Venezuelan football managers
Venezuelan Primera División managers
Mineros de Guayana managers
Venezuelan expatriate football managers
Expatriate football managers in the Dominican Republic
Expatriate football managers in Bolivia
Llaneros Escuela de Fútbol managers